This is a list of municipalities in Kosovo which have standing links to local communities in other countries known as "town twinning" (usually in Europe) or "sister cities" (usually in the rest of the world).

D
Deçan

 Plav, Montenegro
 Ulcinj, Montenegro

Dragash

 Orhaneli, Turkey
 Sapanca, Turkey

Drenas
 Karaisalı, Turkey

F
Ferizaj

 Cedar Falls, United States
 Karacabey, Turkey

Fushë Kosova

 Civita, Italy
 Frascineto, Italy
 Silifke, Turkey

G
Gjakova

 Fort Dodge, United States
 Lodève, France

Gjilan

 Nazilli, Turkey
 Sarandë, Albania
 Sioux City, United States
 Yıldırım, Turkey

K
Kaçanik
 Moosseedorf, Switzerland

Klina
 Adapazarı, Turkey

L
Leposavić
 Vranje, Serbia

Lipjan

 Civita, Italy
 Frascineto, Italy

M
Malisheva
 Orhangazi, Turkey

Mamusha

 Büyükçekmece, Turkey
 Elazığ, Turkey
 Haliliye, Turkey
 Karacabey, Turkey
 Keçiören, Turkey
 Osmangazi, Turkey

Mitrovica

 İnegöl, Turkey
 Korçë, Albania

N
North Mitrovica

 Banja Luka, Bosnia and Herzegovina
 Kraljevo, Serbia

P
Peja

 Afyonkarahisar, Turkey
 Bağcılar, Turkey
 Berane, Montenegro
 Fier, Albania
 Hörby, Sweden
 Johnston, United States
 Nilüfer, Turkey
 Stari Grad (Sarajevo), Bosnia and Herzegovina
 Yalova, Turkey

Podujeva
 Velbert, Germany

Pristina

 Ankara, Turkey
 Bursa, Turkey
 Des Moines, United States
 Karachi, Pakistan
 Namur, Belgium
 Zagreb, Croatia

Prizren

 Amasya, Turkey
 Balıkesir, Turkey
 Berat, Albania
 Beykoz, Turkey
 Bingen am Rhein, Germany
 Herceg Novi, Montenegro
 Karşıyaka, Turkey
 Kavarna, Bulgaria
 Kyjov, Czech Republic
 Osijek, Croatia

R
Rahovec
 Përmet, Albania

S
Suhareka

 Lilburn, United States
 Sarandë, Albania
 Serik, Turkey

V
Vitina
 Mason, United States

Vushtrri
 Norwalk, United States

Z
Zubin Potok
 Gradiška, Bosnia and Herzegovina

Notes

References

Kosovo
Kosovo geography-related lists
Foreign relations of Kosovo
Cities in Kosovo
Populated places in Kosovo